The women's 10,000 metres walk competition at the 1998 Asian Games in Bangkok, Thailand was held on 14 December. This was the last time that this event was contested at the Asian Games later replaced by 20 kilometres walk.

Schedule
All times are Indochina Time (UTC+07:00)

Results
Legend
DSQ — Disqualified

References

External links
Results

Women's 10,000 metres walk
1998